The Order of Merit for Agriculture, Fisheries and Food is a Civil Order of Merit awarded by Spain.  It is awarded to recognize people and organizations for outstanding performance in agriculture, fisheries, and food in all its manifestations.  The order was established by Royal Decree 421/1987, on 27 February 1987.

History
This order replaced the former Order of Merit for Agriculture, created on 3 December 1905 and established by Royal Decree on 9 February  1906.

Classes
The classes of the order may be awarded in one of three divisions, agriculture, fisheries, and food.  Individuals are awarded one of six classes of the order, while organizations and groups may be recognized by one of three classes of plaque.  Awards of the Grand Cross and Gold Plaque are granted by Royal Decree.  The Grand Cross and Gold Plaque may be awarded to cover all three divisions.

Individuals
Individuals are recognized with one of the following six classes of the order:
Grand Cross (Gran Cruz)
Commander by Number (Encomienda de Número)
Commander (Encomienda)
Officer's Cross (Cruz de Oficial)
Cross (Cruz)
Bronze Medal (Medalla de Bronce)

Other entities
Groups, organizations, and other legal entities are recognized with one of the following three classes:
Gold Plaque (Placa de Oro)
Silver Plaque (Placa de Plata)
Bronze Plaque (Placa de Bronce)

References

Agriculture